Pacificulla philotima is a moth in the family Lecithoceridae. It was described by Alexey Diakonoff in 1954. It is endemic to New Guinea.

References

philotima
Moths of New Guinea
Endemic fauna of New Guinea
Moths described in 1954